Aliens: Phalanx is a 2020 sci-fi horror novel by Scott Sigler and the ninth book in third novel series based on the Aliens franchise. The novel is set on Ataegina, a planet of castles and medieval culture where a sect of humanity is engaged in conflict with an army of Xenomorphs.

Synopsis
The novel is set on the world of Ataegina, where humanity lives in mountain holds in order to escape death from the "demons", their name for Xenomorphs. They are unaware of life on other planets or other events in the Alien universe and their culture is varied but similar to feudalism. The inhabitants pass along what limited information they know about the demons, including knowledge of a Demon Mother living on Black Smoke Mountain, through warnings and mythology.

The story focuses primarily on Ahiliyah, Brandun, and Creen, runners from Lemeth Hold. Runners are responsible for making trips to various holds such as Dakatera and Keflan while carrying large amounts of cargo to trade for much needed goods, supplies, and information. Although proud of her skills, Ahiliyah chafes under the patriarchal mindset of the Hold and would rather be a warrior. Women are not allowed to become warriors due to the Margrave and council's belief that women cannot be good warriors and can only perform gender specific roles, such as motherhood and marriage. 

On a run from her hold to Dakatera and Keflan, Ahiliyah is approached by the Margravine of Dakatera, the only female hold leader, with an offer to move to the more liberal Dakatera and become a trainer. Ahiliyah declines and continues on to Keflan to retrieve medical supplies, only to discover that it has been overtaken by demons. On the run back to Lemeth the trio are discovered by a demon and almost killed, however Ahiliyah manages to kill it. In the process they discover that the caminus leaves they use as camouflage and grow in abundance everywhere can neutralize the demons' blood. When they finally reach their hold they discover that Keflan survivors had made it to Lemeth but were turned away by the unsympathetic Margrave. Ahiliyah is successful in convincing the Margrave to allow Creen to research caminus leaves as a weapon, but cannot convince him that Lemeth could end up like Keflan - not even after another hold is discovered to have met a similar fate. 

Creen manages to create a paste that can kill demons, albeit slowly. While on their way back from testing it they discover the Margravine and many survivors from Dakatera, as their hold had also fallen. They manage to help the survivors inside, only to soon discover that Lemeth is also under attack. The demons managed to break into the holds by breeding with a burrowing animal, creating a demons that can create tunnels for infiltration. Ahiliyah takes command of several warriors and using the paste, successfully makes it through both the initial attack and a second wave of demons. She sends word to other holds to send warriors to march on Black Smoke Mountain and kill the Demon Mother, as they now have a weapon against them. Troops from one of the other holds arrive and march with her, but the commander refuses to follow Ahiliyah's strategy of a circular phalanx. As a result they are overtaken and brought into the mountain to become hosts for new demons.

Ahiliyah, Brandun, and Creen manage to survive by eating the caminus leaves on their clothing, which kills the demon embryos. While trying to escape they encounter Zachariah, a synthetic that tells them the history of the demons. Just over 300 years ago a colony ship was overtaken by Xenomorphs and crash landed on Ataegina. The ship's crew and presumably adult colonists die, but the children survive and go on to form civilizations without knowledge of the outside universe. The Xenomorphs also survived and eventually managed to make their way out of the mountain and overtake the humans, forcing them to live in holds.

Ahiliyah comes up with the idea of killing the Demon Mother by cooking her with a superheated blast of water from a geyser, but this plan is unsuccessful and Zachariah is killed by one of the demons. Brandun then chooses to use their final dose of poison to kill the Demon Mother, sacrificing himself in the process. The remaining demons are relatively easily killed by the remaining troops and new refreshments from other holds and Ahiliyah becomes the ruler of a new, unified Ataegina, continuing to train her army against the threat of human raiders from across the sea to the north.

Development 
When creating the novel's storyline, Sigler chose to focus on what would happen if there was a planet-wide Xenomorph attack and the survivors could only fight using only spears and shields. He also chose to set this in a medieval society that had no knowledge of the rest of the universe, spaceships, advanced weaponry, or Weyland-Yutani, as well as other typical elements featured in the Aliens franchise, something he described as challenging. In an interview with Daily Dead he described this as “300 meets Aliens.” Sigler researched Sumerian, Egyptian, Greek, and Roman societies and used Myke Cole’s Legion vs. Phalanx heavily as reference material.

Publication
Aliens: Phalanx was released in paperback and e-book format on February 25, 2020 in the United States and United Kingdom through Titan Books. A limited edition hardback was also released through Titan Books on the same day. An audiobook adaptation narrated by Bronson Pinchot was simultaneously released through Blackstone Publishing.

Reception
In a review for the British Fantasy Society Sarah Deeming praised the character of Ahiliyah and the novel's tension. Empire Online listed the audiobook adaptation as one of thirteen "Best Audiobooks For Movie Fans" and Aliens: Phalanx also received a review from the Financial Times. Ginger Nuts of Horror stated that they were "whether the constraints of the Aliens franchise (acid for blood etc) would hold back the multi-dimensional imagination of the Future Doom Overlord (FDO), as his hardcore fans like to call him" and that while this did prove to be the case, the novel was "still an excellent Scott Sigler novel and if you’re a fan of his high-octane action sequences, gory violence and tough characters there is much to enjoy here."

References

External links 

 

Alien (franchise) novels
2020s horror novels
Novels by Scott Sigler